South Moniteau Township is one of fourteen townships in Cooper County, Missouri, USA.  As of the 2000 census, its population was 194.

Geography
According to the United States Census Bureau, South Moniteau Township covers an area of 22.41 square miles (58.04 square kilometers); of this, 22.39 square miles (57.98 square kilometers, 99.9 percent) is land and 0.02 square miles (0.06 square kilometers, 0.1 percent) is water.

Adjacent townships
 North Moniteau Township (north)
 Linn Township, Moniteau County (northeast)
 Walker Township, Moniteau County (east)
 Moreau Township, Moniteau County (south)
 Willow Fork Township, Moniteau County (southwest)
 Kelly Township (west)

Cemeteries
The township contains these cemeteries: Renshaw and Smiley,

School districts
 Clarksburg C-2
 Moniteau County R-I School District
 Prairie Home R-V School District

Political districts
 Missouri's 6th congressional district
 State House District 117
 State Senate District 21

References
 United States Census Bureau 2008 TIGER/Line Shapefiles
 United States Board on Geographic Names (GNIS)
 United States National Atlas

External links
 US-Counties.com
 City-Data.com

Townships in Cooper County, Missouri
Townships in Missouri